Gus Williams may refer to:
Gus Williams (vaudeville) (1848–1915), American comedian and songwriter
Gus Williams (outfielder) (1888–1964), German-American baseball player
Gus Williams (pitcher) (1870–1890), Major League Baseball pitcher
Gus Williams (musician) (1937–2010), Australian country singer
Gus Williams (basketball) (born 1953), American basketball player

See also
August Williams (disambiguation)
Augustine Williams (disambiguation)
Guy Williams (disambiguation)